Eskikaraağaç is a village in the Karacabey district of Bursa Province in Turkey.

The village is located on a very small peninsula, inshore of Lake Uluabat. The local community is composed of people who immigrated from Drama, Greece in 1924 as a result of population exchange between Greece and Turkey, and people who immigrated from Bulgaria in 1937.

Eskikaraagac is a Ramsar site. Local people are mainly employed in agriculture, and fisheries. The village is designated for its dedication to the protection of the white storks and therefore is a member of European Stork Villages Network since 2011. The village is running an annual “Stork Festival” in early summer since 2005. The friendship between a fisherman and a stork (Yaren) in the village was filmed and was awarded as best documentary at  2020 International Prague Film Awards.

See also 
Yaren (stork)
Gölyazı

References

Villages in Karacabey District